William Andrew may refer to:

 William Andrew (cricketer) (1869–1911), English first class cricketer
 William Andrew (priest) (1884–1963), Anglican priest
 William Andrew (publisher), technical publisher and imprint of Elsevier
 William E. Andrew, chancellor of the University of Prince Edward Island, Canada

See also

Andrew, William